The 2nd Women's European Amateur Boxing Championships were held in Pécs, Hungary from May 11 to 17, 2003.
This edition of the biennial competition was organised by the European governing body for amateur boxing, EABA.
Competitions took place in 13 weight classes.

Russia were again top medal winners, but her dominance was much reduced since the 2001 Women's European Amateur Boxing Championships.

Medal table

Medal winners

References

European Amateur Boxing Championships
Boxing
Women's European Amateur Boxing Championships
May 2003 sports events in Europe
International boxing competitions hosted by Hungary
European